Greifenstein is a municipality in Germany.

It may also refer to the following castles:
Burg Greifenstein in Austria
Château de Greifenstein in Saverne, France
Greifenstein Castle in Filisur, Switzerland
Greifenstein Castle (Hesse) in Greifenstein, Germany
Schloss Greifenstein in Heiligenstadt in Oberfranken, Germany